The men's 60 metres hurdles event at the 2023 European Athletics Indoor Championships is held on 4 March 2023 at 11:20 (heats) and on 5 March 2023 10:35 (semi-finals), at 21:05 (final) local time.

Medalists

Records

Results

Heats 
Qualification: First 3 in each heat (Q) and the next fastest 4 (q) advance to the Semifinals.

Semifinals 
Qualification: First 4 in each heat (Q) advance to the Final.

Final

References 

2023 European Athletics Indoor Championships
60 metres hurdles at the European Athletics Indoor Championships